Jacques Heurgon (25 January 1903 – 27 October 1995) was a French university, normalian, Etruscan scholar and Latinist, professor of Latin language and literature at the Sorbonne.

A member of the École française de Rome (1928–1930), he was elected a member of the Académie des Inscriptions et Belles-Lettres in 1969.

Biography 
Coming from a family of Parisian jewelers, he studied at the lycée Condorcet, where he met poet Jean Tardieu, with whom he would correspond for twenty years. Entered in the École normale supérieure in 1923, he was received at the first rank of the agrégation de lettres. In 1926, he married the daughter of his former professor in khâgne, Paul Desjardins, who would organize at the abbaye de Pontigny the "", literary meetings attended, among others, by André Gide, Bernard Groethuysen and Roger Martin du Gard.

Publications 
 Recherches sur l'histoire, la religion et la civilisation de Capoue préromaine des origines à la deuxième guerre punique (« Bibliothèque des Écoles françaises d'Athènes et de Rome », 154), Paris, de Boccard, 1942, 483 p. (State thesis).
 Rome et la Méditerranée occidentale jusqu'aux guerres puniques, Nouvelle Clio, PUF, 3rd edition 1993 
 La Vie quotidienne des Étrusques, Hachette, 1961 and 1989, 361 pages 
 Le Trésor de Ténès, 86 pages, 1958, reprint Flammarion, 1992 
 Le ciel a eu le temps de changer, correspondence 1922-1944 de Jacques Heurgon with Jean Tardieu, 272 pages, 2004,

References

External links 
 Jacques Heurgon on Encyclopedia Universalis
 Jacques Heurgon on the site of the Académie des Inscriptions et Belles-Lettres
 Obituary on the site of the Independent
 Allocution à l'occasion du décès de M. Jacques Heurgon, académicien ordinaire on Persée

Members of the Académie des Inscriptions et Belles-Lettres
French scholars of Roman history
20th-century French historians
French Latinists
Linguists of Etruscan
Lycée Condorcet alumni
École Normale Supérieure alumni
Writers from Paris
1903 births
1995 deaths
Corresponding Fellows of the British Academy
Academic staff of the University of Paris